Wiktor Kemula (born November 6, 1902 in Izmail – October 17, 1985 in Warsaw) was a famous Polish chemist, electrochemist, and polarographist. He greatly contributed to the development of electroanalytical chemistry, particularly polarography. He developed a hanging mercury drop electrode (HMDE).

1902 births
1985 deaths
People from Izmail
People from Izmailsky Uyezd
People from the Russian Empire of Polish descent
Polish chemists
University of Lviv alumni
Victims of post–World War II forced migrations